Milton Nicks Jr. is an American politician and former law enforcement officer serving as a member of the Arkansas House of Representatives from the 50th district. Elected in November 2014, he assumed office on January 12, 2015.

Early life and education 
Nicks was born and raised in Earle, Arkansas. He graduated from the Arkansas State Police Academy and Arkansas Law Enforcement Training Academy.

Career 
Prior to entering politics, Nicks served as an Arkansas State Police officer. He was also the owner and CEO of a construction company and worked as the pastor of the Mount Pilgrim Baptist Church. Nicks was elected to the Arkansas House of Representatives in November 2014 and assumed office on January 12, 2015.

References 

Living people
Democratic Party members of the Arkansas House of Representatives
People from Crittenden County, Arkansas
21st-century American politicians
Year of birth missing (living people)